He Who Rides the Tiger is the 1980 second solo album by longtime Elton John lyricist, Bernie Taupin. It is his follow-up effort following his 1971 spoken word album Taupin. Taupin co-wrote all the songs in the album with the Buckinghams former guitarist Dennis Tufano and sang lead vocals in all of them. Although the album was recorded during a time when John and Taupin had interrupted their collaboration, John lent backing vocals on "Love (The Barren Desert)". The album was re-released on CD by American Beat Records on March 10, 2009.

Critical reception
In the review of May 3, 1980 Billboard critics said that the album's "biggest strength lies in his lyrics." They also found that "Taupin isn't a bad vocalist" (but sometimes "become a bit too stagnant") and praised "the aid of Elton and other supporting singers."

Track listing
All songs written by Bernie Taupin (words) and Dennis Tufano (music).

 "Monkey on My Back (The Last Run)" (4:04)
 "Born on the Fourth of July" (4:47)
 "Venezuela" (4:11)
 "Approaching Armageddon" (5:36)
 "Lover's Cross" (4:40)
 "Blitz Babies" (4:31)
 "Valley Nights" (4:23)
 "Love (The Barren Desert)" (5:32)
 "The Whores of Paris" (6:22)

Personnel
Bernie Taupin - lead vocals
Joey Carbone - keyboards
Kenny Passarelli - bass guitar, vocals
Dennis Tufano - rhythm guitar, vocals
Carlos Vega - drums
Paulinho da Costa - percussion
Dee Murray - bass guitar
Richie Zito - electric guitar, acoustic guitar
Jeff Porcaro - drums
David Foster - keyboards, synthesizer
Tom Scott - saxophone, flute, lyricon
David Hungate - bass guitar
Steve Lukather - electric guitar
Ralph Dyke - synthesizer, programming
Jay Graydon - electric guitar
Paul Lani - percussion
Michael Boddicker - keyboards, programming, synthesizer
Erich Bulling - charango, flute, acoustic guitar, ocarina
Elton John - backing vocals 
Alan Gorrie - backing vocals 
Hamish Stuart - backing vocals 
Bill Champlin - backing vocals 
Venette Gloud - backing vocals 
Paulette Brown - backing vocals 
Tommy Funderburk - backing vocals 
Tom Kelly - backing vocals

References

1980 albums
Albums produced by Humberto Gatica
Elektra Records albums